Matilda Tao Ching-ying (born 29 October 1969) is a Taiwanese singer, television host and author. 

Tao graduated from National Chengchi University. In 2005, she married Taiwanese actor Lee Lee-zen.

Filmography

Hosting

Variety show

Award ceremonies

Awards and nominations

Golden Bell Awards

|-
| 1999
| Love Lecture
| Best Host in a Television Programme
|
|-
| 2001
| Entertainment News
| rowspan=5|Best Host in a Variety Programme
|
|-
| 2007
| rowspan=4|One Million Star
|
|-
| 2008
|
|-
| 2009
|
|-
| 2010
|

References

External links

 Agency
 Mini-Blog

Living people
1969 births
Taiwanese television personalities
Taiwanese women singers
Musicians from Taipei
National Chengchi University alumni